Bakeridesia is a genus of flowering plants belonging to the family Malvaceae.

Its native range is Mexico to Venezuela, Eastern Brazil.

Species:

Bakeridesia amoena 
Bakeridesia bakeriana 
Bakeridesia chittendenii 
Bakeridesia esculenta 
Bakeridesia exalata 
Bakeridesia ferruginea 
Bakeridesia gaumeri 
Bakeridesia gloriosa 
Bakeridesia guerrerensis 
Bakeridesia huastecana 
Bakeridesia integerrima 
Bakeridesia jaliscana 
Bakeridesia molinae 
Bakeridesia nelsonii 
Bakeridesia notolophium 
Bakeridesia parvifolia 
Bakeridesia pittieri 
Bakeridesia vulcanicola 
Bakeridesia yucatana 
Bakeridesia zapoteca

References

Malvaceae
Malvaceae genera